This is a list of present-day cities by the time period over which they have been continuously inhabited as a city. The age claims listed are generally disputed. Differences in opinion can result from different definitions of "city" as well as "continuous habitation" and historical evidence is often disputed. Caveats (and sources) to the validity of each claim are discussed in the "Notes" column.

Africa

Northern and the Horn

Sub-Saharan

Americas

North America

South America

Asia

Central and South Asia

East Asia

Southeast Asia

West Asia

Europe

Oceania

See also
 Historical urban community sizes
 List of cities in the Americas by year of foundation (includes ancient native sites)
 List of cities of the ancient Near East
 List of largest cities throughout history, including ones no longer inhabited
 List of oldest known surviving buildings

References

External links
 

Oldest continuously inhabited
Cities, oldest continuously inhabited
Oldest
Cities, oldest continuously inhabited
Lists of longest-duration things